Louis Frausto Pérez, Jr. (born January 29, 1953) is an American songwriter, percussionist and guitarist for Los Lobos and Latin Playboys.

Pérez started with Los Lobos playing primarily jarana (a small Mexican guitar) and singing. He is one of the founding members of Los Lobos, established in 1973. As Los Lobos ventured into Norteño music and rock, Pérez became the drummer, first with just a snare drum. In 1990, Victor Bisetti was hired to be a combination drum tech, drum coach and percussionist. As time went on, Bisetti took a more active role as drummer, allowing Pérez to move back to the front of the stage and start playing guitar. Bisetti was replaced in 2003 by Ruben (Cougar) Estrada. Estrada was replaced by Enrique "Bugs" Gonzalez in 2013.

Pérez continues to be Los Lobos' primary lyricist. He also paints in his free time and has been the art director and artistic supervisor on many of Los Lobos' albums.

References 

American Sephardic Jews
1953 births
Living people
American percussionists
Songwriters from California
Musicians from Los Angeles
Los Lobos members
20th-century American drummers
American male drummers
20th-century American guitarists
Latin Playboys members
American male guitarists
Guitarists from California
20th-century American male musicians
American male songwriters